Perigymnosoma is a genus of flies in the family Tachinidae.

Species
 Perigymnosoma globulum Villeneuve, 1929

References

Tachinidae